Zoro (born Daniel Donnelly, June 13, 1962) is an American drummer, mainly in the styles of rock, R&B, and hip hop. Known as 'The Minister of Groove', his feel, drive, syncopation and drumming philosophy make him one of the most well-known and respected drummers in the world today. He is notable for his foot technique, playing mostly heel-down and quickly striking and releasing the beaters from the bass drum head which contrasts with the 'planting' of other contemporary drummers.

Zoro has toured and recorded with Lenny Kravitz, Bobby Brown, 
Frankie Valli and the Four Seasons, New Edition, Jody Watley, Sean Lennon, Philip Bailey, Lisa Marie Presley, and Throttle Body Motorcycle Club, among others. He has often been voted number one R&B drummer and number one clinician in Modern Drummer magazine, in addition to receiving awards from other magazines such as 'Drum!'

Author

Zoro is the author of four books. "The Commandments of R&B Drumming" earned him a Modern Drummer Reader's Poll #1 Educational text vote. The book was expanded and re-released by Alfred Publishing in a 10th anniversary edition. The follow up, "The Commandments of Early R&B Drumming" was written with Daniel Glass. In 2011, he published "The Big Gig", a book centered on achievement in the music industry. In September 2016 he released "SOAR!: 9 Proven Keys For Unlocking Your Limitless Potential"

Christian Faith

In addition to his work in music, Zoro is a Christian Motivational speaker appearing at festivals and churches around the world. He has featured on Christian television, including the 700 Club, Daystar Celebration, Jc-TV, The Joni Show, MorningStar Ministries, among other broadcasts.

Ministry and Motivational Speaking and Teaching

Now working out of Nashville, TN, Zoro is increasingly focused on his Ministry and motivational speaking work for groups like Big Brothers Big Sisters and Compassion International. 

Zoro is currently a percussion instructor at Belmont University in Nashville. He is also a pastor at Bayside Church Adventure Campus in Roseville, CA.

Gear and Equipment

Zoro is endorsed by DW Drums, Evans, Latin Percussion among other manufacturers. His most recent set of note was played during his 2004 engagement with Lenny Kravitz, drumming on the "Baptism" tour.

References

External links
 http://www.zorothedrummer.com/
 http://www.zoroministries.org/
Zoro Interview NAMM Oral History Library (2012)

Living people
1962 births
20th-century American drummers
American male drummers
20th-century American male musicians